Costacciaro is a comune (municipality) in the Province of Perugia in the Italian region Umbria, located about 40 km northeast of Perugia. It is a medieval burgh, which, after the rule of Perugia and Gubbio, became part of the Papal States in the 15th century.

Hamlets (Frazioni) are Costa San Savino and Villa Col dei Canali.

Costacciaro borders the following municipalities: Fabriano, Gubbio, Sassoferrato, Scheggia e Pascelupo, Sigillo. The town was founded around 1250 by the commune of Gubbio as a stronghold against the nearby fortress of Sigillo, held by the commune of Perugia.

References

External links
Official website

Cities and towns in Umbria